One For All is the eleventh studio album by the English heavy metal band Raven, released 23 May 2000 in the USA.

Track listing

Personnel
John Gallagher - bass, vocals
Mark Gallagher - guitar
Joe Hasselvander - drums

References

2000 albums
Raven (British band) albums
Pony Canyon albums
Massacre Records albums
Metal Blade Records albums
Albums produced by Michael Wagener